Walter Waalderbos (born 21 July 1951) is a retired Dutch footballer who played as a defender.

External links
 

1951 births
Living people
Dutch footballers
Association football defenders
Go Ahead Eagles players
FC Groningen players
FC Emmen players